Ross Fitzgerald is an American politician who is a Republican member of the Montana House of Representatives. Since 2017, he has represented the 17th district.

References

1949 births
Living people
Republican Party members of the Montana House of Representatives
21st-century American politicians
Politicians from Great Falls, Montana